Rajshahi Cantonment is the Bangladeshi military cantonment in Rajshahi. It is the home of Bangladesh Infantry Regimental Centre.

Institutions
Bangladesh Infantry Regimental Centre.

BIRC Training Battalion

Education
Rajshahi Cantonment Public School and College.
Rajshahi Cantonment Board School.

References

Cantonments of Bangladesh
Organisations based in Rajshahi